was a Japanese video game developer, most notable for having developed the Puyo Puyo series, a franchise derived from the Madō Monogatari series. On 6 November 2003, the company shut down amid bankruptcy. As a result, key staff moved to Compile Heart, the company's spiritual successor, whereas shoot-'em-up staff moved to MileStone Inc.

The Compile trademark is being used as a brand label by Compile Heart to promote merchandise and games based on Compile properties. As of 2010, Compile Heart entered into a licensing deal with D4 Enterprise to create new video games based on franchises from Compile properties. This agreement does not affect the rights to the Puyo Puyo series as Sega retains ownership of the property.

In April 2016, Niitani started a new successor company to Compile, Compile Maru. The company launched the game Nyoki Nyoki: Tabidachi Hen for Nintendo 3DS on the Nintendo eShop with a follow-up scheduled for Nintendo Switch.

Puyo Puyo
Compile debuted their most successful title, Puyo Puyo, on the MSX computer in 1991. Puyo Puyo is a falling-block puzzle game similar to Tetris (1984). The object of the game is to create groups of four or more "Puyos" of the same color as they fall from the top of the screen. This simple yet addictive concept was expanded on in a series of sequels over the course of two decades.

Puyo Puyo reached North America and the PAL region in graphically altered form under the title of Dr. Robotnik's Mean Bean Machine for the Mega Drive/Genesis, as well as on the Super Nintendo (as Kirby's Avalanche in North America and Kirby's Ghost Trap in the PAL region). However, the series' unaltered appearance was Puyo Pop, a title used for games that were released on the PC Engine, Neo Geo Pocket Color and Game Boy Advance.

As part of Compile's restructuring in 1998, the rights to Puyo Puyo were sold to Sega, but Compile's franchise right would remain until their bankruptcy in 2002, thus allowing Sega to publish Puyo Puyo~n and Puyo Puyo Box. Later Puyo Puyo games were developed by Sonic Team, who created Puyo Pop Fever.

Shoot 'em ups
Until 1993, Compile focused much of their development efforts on the shoot 'em up genre. In the 1990s, a few Compile personnel left the company to work for another video game development company, 8ing/Raizing (est. 1993). There they contributed to such games as Mahou Daisakusen (1993) and Battle Garegga (1996).

Some employees who stayed with Compile until its end reincorporated as MileStone Inc. in April 2003, and continued to develop new shooters.

Some of Compile's shoot-'em-up games include:

Zanac
First released on the MSX computer in 1986, Zanac combined fast action with an AI system, which changes based on your style of play. Zanac received a true sequel, Zanac EX and an NES port. There was also a parody of Zanac called Gun-Nac, released by Nexoft for the NES in 1991. Similar to Konami's own Parodius games, Gun-Nac brought humor to the gameplay of the original by replacing the enemies with carrot-throwing rabbits and letting the player purchase weapons in a fast food store at the end of each stage. In 2001, Compile released an updated version for the PlayStation titled Zanac X Zanac, which included an original sequel entitled Zanac Neo.

Aleste
Aleste was released on the MSX2 and ported to the Master System. A sequel, Aleste 2, was also released for the MSX2. Musha Aleste (titled M.U.S.H.A. in the US) was released on the Mega Drive in 1990. The game takes place in a unique Japanese futuristic setting. Super Aleste came out in 1992 for the Super Famicom and was retitled Space Megaforce in North America. Aleste is now available on cellular phones, courtesy of Aiky.

Gunhed / Blazing Lazers
Gunhed (retitled Blazing Lazers for North America) was released in 1989 and became a showpiece for NEC's PC Engine console.

Spriggan
Developed jointly by Compile and Naxat Soft under the common label Nazac, Seirei Senshi Spriggan and Spriggan Mark 2 were respectively released in 1991 and 1992 for the PC Engine CD-ROM system.

Games developed
Games marked with a dagger are conversions of a pre-existing version of a game as opposed to being natively developed.

As Programmers-3 Inc.

As Compile

References

External links
Compile page
Alky page
Compile Station Compile portal by D4 Enterprise, inc.
MileStone official website - The official website of MileStone, a game design firm founded by former Compile employees (Japanese)
Mono Omou Ishi (Thinking Stone) - MileStone's official English-language web log (no longer updated)
Compile Heart official home page - The official web site of Compile Heart, a game design firm founded by former Compile employees

Video game development companies
Video game companies established in 1982
Video game companies disestablished in 2003
Defunct video game companies of Japan
Japanese companies disestablished in 2003
Japanese companies established in 1982